X-Men: Wolverine's Rage is a side-scrolling video game for the Game Boy Color. Wolverine's Rage follows the story of Wolverine as he chases down Lady Deathstrike, Sabretooth, and Cyber.

Plot
Lady Deathstrike discovers schematics allowing her to build a weapon that will melt Wolverine's adamantium skeleton. Lady Deathstrike decides to go ahead with the machine and Wolverine has to do whatever it takes to track her down and stop her.

Gameplay
Gameplay in Wolverine's Rage is relatively simple and repetitive. There are twenty levels in the game, grouped into chapters of five with a boss battle at the end of each one. If Wolverine is hurt he can regenerate his health back. The objective on most of the levels is to run through them before time runs out, battling enemies on the way. The player uses a password system in order to continue the game.

Reception

The game was met with mixed reviews, as GameRankings gave it 56%.

References

External links

2001 video games
Game Boy Color games
Action video games
Superhero video games
Video games set in New York City
Video games set in Tokyo
Game Boy Color-only games
Digital Eclipse games
Single-player video games
Activision games
Video games developed in the United States